Kildavin is a small village in County Carlow, Ireland. Situated on at the junction of the N80 national secondary road and the R724 regional road, it lies 5 km north of  Bunclody, County Wexford at the northern end of the Blackstairs Mountains.

Fauna

The River Slaney at Kildavin is one of a limited number of places in Ireland where the rare goosander is seen in winter. Examples of yellowhammer (an increasingly rare songbird in Ireland) and the great spotted woodpecker have also been seen here.

See also
 List of towns and villages in Ireland

References

Towns and villages in County Carlow